Luc Alphand (born 6 August 1965) is a former World Cup alpine ski racer from France. He specialized in the speed events and later became a race car driver.

Ski racing 
Born in Briançon (Hautes-Alpes), Alphand was world junior champion in 1983 and made his World Cup debut in 1984.  It took a decade for him to make his breakthrough winning his first world cup at Kitzbühel 1995, and going on to take the overall downhill title 3 years in a row. In 1997 he won the World Cup overall title by collecting points only in the two speed disciplines, downhill and super G – a unique achievement in World Cup history. For this accomplishment he was voted L'Equipe Champion of Champions in 1997. The previous year he won a bronze medal at the 1996 World Championships at Sierra Nevada, Spain.

In the village of Chantemerle (which neighbours his home town of Briançon in the Serre-Chevalier region) an expert ski run has been named in his honour.

His daughter, Estelle Alphand, represents Sweden in FIS Alpine Ski World Cup.

World Cup results

Season standings

Season titles

Race victories
12 wins (10 DH, 2 SG)
23 podiums (18 DH, 5 SG)

Other results
 Junior World Champion of the downhill in 1983
 French Alpine Skiing Championship
 Champion of the downhill in 1985, 1987, 1989, 1990 and 1994
 Champion of the super-G in 1988
 Champion of combined in 1987

Auto racing 

He retired from competitive skiing in 1997 and started a career in auto racing. First in the Nissan Micra Stars Cup (1997–1998), then in the European Le Mans Series (2001), the FIA GT Championship (2002), and the Lamborghini Supertrophy (2002). He won the 2006 Dakar Rally, in which he had finished runner-up a year earlier. With this victory, he was the first ex-skier to win the Paris-Dakar. He recently purchased two Corvette race cars from Pratt & Miller for use in the Le Mans Series and 24 Hours of Le Mans.

Alphand suffered severe back injuries in an accident on the Rand'Auvergne all-terrain motorcycle race on 27 June 2009. In November 2010 he retired from competitive auto racing due to health reasons.

24 Hours of Le Mans results

Dakar Rally results

References

External links 

 
 
 Luc Alphand World Cup standings at the International Ski Federation
 
 
 Luc Alphand – Valeo MotorSports
 Luc Alphand and Valeo – 24H of Le Mans Luc Alphand and Valeo – 24H of Le Mans

1965 births
Living people
People from Briançon
French male alpine skiers
French racing drivers
FIA GT Championship drivers
Off-road racing drivers
24 Hours of Le Mans drivers
Dakar Rally drivers
Dakar Rally winning drivers
European Le Mans Series drivers
Porsche Supercup drivers
FIS Alpine Ski World Cup champions
24 Hours of Spa drivers
Alpine skiers at the 1988 Winter Olympics
Alpine skiers at the 1992 Winter Olympics
Alpine skiers at the 1994 Winter Olympics
Olympic alpine skiers of France
Sportspeople from Hautes-Alpes